Cameron Steward Drew (born February 12, 1964) is an American former professional baseball player. He made his Major League Baseball debut on September 9, 1988. Previous knee injuries limited his major league career to seven games.

Drew was drafted by the Houston Astros in the 1st round (12th pick) of the 1985 amateur draft after starring on the University of New Haven baseball team.

Drew collected numerous awards in his brief rise through the minor leagues and was tapped by many scouts at the time to be a superstar. After a seven-game stint during a September 1988 callup, Drew was forced to retire when it was determined that his basketball-damaged knees would never hold up to the rigors of a Major League Baseball career.

External links

Cameron Drew's Statistics at Sports Illustrated Website
Cameron Drew's Statistics at Baseball Almanac

Major League Baseball outfielders
Baseball players from Boston
New Haven Chargers baseball players
Houston Astros players
Auburn Astros players
Tucson Toros players
Asheville Tourists players
Columbus Astros players
Kinston Indians players
1964 births
Living people